Bleicherode is a town in the district of Nordhausen, in Thuringia, Germany. It is situated on the river Wipper, 17 km southwest of Nordhausen. On 1 December 2007, the former municipality Obergebra was incorporated by Bleicherode. The former municipalities Etzelsrode, Friedrichsthal, Kleinbodungen, Kraja, Hainrode, Nohra, Wipperdorf and Wolkramshausen were merged into Bleicherode in January 2019. Every Tuesday and Thursday, there is a market held at the Zierbrunnenplatz in the town.

Historically, Bleicherode belonged to the Prussian province of Saxony between 1700 and 1945.

One of Bleicherode's most famous natives is the cartographer August Heinrich Petermann.

Notable persons 

 August Heinrich Petermann (1822–1878), German cartographer
 Adalbert Merx (1838–1909), German theologian
 Hans Beyth (1901–1947), German-Jewish banker and Zionist (leader of Youth Aliyah, 1945–47)

See also
Gerson von Bleichröder (1822–1893), German-Jewish banker, Chief banker of Otto von Bismarck

References

Nordhausen (district)